The 2017–18 Serie C was the fourth season of the unified Serie C (formerly Lega Pro) division, the third tier of the Italian football league system.

Teams 

A total of 60 teams were expected to contest the league, including 4 sides relegated from the 2016–17 Serie B season, 47 sides who played the 2016–17 Lega Pro season, and 9 sides promoted from the 2016–17 Serie D.

On 24 May 2017 Latina, just relegated to Lega Pro from Serie B, was declared insolvent and excluded from the Italian football league system, thus creating a first vacancy in the league composition.

Como did not obtain the necessary federal licence before 30 June 2017, the latest possible date to enrol in the 2017–18 league, and were subsequently excluded creating a second vacancy.

On 6 July, FIGC's Co.Vi.So.C announced that Akragas, Maceratese, Mantova and Messina did not submit a copy of their bank guarantees. Maceratese, Mantova and Messina chose not to file appeals and were excluded from the division, however, Akragas, Arezzo, Fidelis Andria, Juve Stabia and Modena all successfully appealed the initial decision and on 20 July it was confirmed that they would all remain in the division.

On 4 August, Triestina was declared the only eligible club to compete in Serie C as replacement for the excluded ones. This brought the number of clubs that will compete in the 2017–18 Serie C down from 60 to 56.

On 11 August Rende was also declared eligible to compete in Serie C, so the final number of teams will be 57, divided in three groups of 19 teams each.

On 6 November, Modena was officially excluded from the league and dissolved after failing to attend four consecutive matches due to financial irregularities.

Relegated from Serie B 
 Trapani
 Vicenza
 Pisa

Promoted from Serie D 
 Cuneo (Girone A winners)
 Monza (Girone B winners)
 Mestre (Girone C winners)
 Ravenna (Girone D winners)
 Gavorrano (Girone E winners)
 Fermana (Girone F winners)
 Arzachena (Girone G winners)
 Bisceglie (Girone H winners)
 Leonzio (Girone I winners)
 Triestina (Girone C runner-up and playoff winner)

Stadia and locations

Group A (North & Central West)
10 teams from Tuscany, 2 teams from Lombardy, 2 teams from Piedmont, 2 teams from Sardinia, 2 teams from Emilia-Romagna and 1 team from Lazio.

Group B (North & Central East)
4 teams from Emilia-Romagna, 4 teams from Veneto, 3 teams from Marche, 3 teams from Lombardy, 2 teams from Friuli-Venezia Giulia,  1 team from Abruzzo, 1 team from Trentino-Alto Adige and 1 team from Umbria.

Group C (South)
5 teams from Sicily, 5 teams from Apulia, 4 teams from Calabria, 3 teams from Campania, 1 team from Lazio and 1 team from Basilicata.

League tables

Group A (North & Central West)

Group B (North & Central East)

Group C (South)

Promotion play-offs

First round 
If tied, higher-placed team advances.

|}

 Second round 
If tied, higher-placed team advances.

|}

 Third round 
If tied on aggregate, higher-placed team advances

|}

Notes

 Fourth round 
If tied on aggregate, higher-placed team advances

|}

 Final four 

No away goal rule applies. If tied after regular time, semifinal winner decided by extra-time and penalty shootout Cosenza promoted to Serie B'.

Relegation play-outsLoser on aggregate is relegated. Higher-placed team plays at home for second leg. If tied on aggregate, lower-placed team is relegated.''

|}

Top goalscorers

Note
1Player scored 1 goal in the play-offs.
2Player scored 2 goals in the play-offs.
3Player scored 3 goals in the play-offs.

References 

Serie C seasons
3
Italy